Kenneth Sutherland may refer to:
 Kenneth Sutherland (cyclist), Belizean cyclist
 Kenneth F. Sutherland, American politician from New York
 Kenneth Sutherland, 3rd Lord Duffus, Scottish noble

See also
 Ken Sutherland, composer, lyricist, playwright and artist
 Kenneth Sutherland-Graeme, Anglican priest